Miguel Holguín y Figueroa, also written as Miguel Holguín de Figueroa, (1516, Cáceres, Kingdom of Spain - after 1576, Tunja, New Kingdom of Granada) was a Spanish conquistador. He took part in the expeditions of conquest of the Chitarero, Motilon, U'wa and Lache peoples led by Nikolaus Federmann. Holguín y Figueroa later settled in Tunja, where he protested the rapacious activities of Hernán Pérez de Quesada, governor of Bogotá.

Miguel Holguín y Figueroa was chronicled by Juan Rodríguez Freyle in El Carnero.

Biography 
Miguel Holguín y Figueroa, also written as Holguín de Figueroa, was born in 1516 in Cáceres. He married twice: to Isabel de Cárcamo y Orozco; and Isabel Maldonado de Bohórquez (or Bohórques), widow of Pedro Núñez Cabrera. With Isabel de Cárcamo y Orozco he had two daughters: Inés de Cárcamo and Elvira de Holguín; with Isabel Maldonado de Bohórquez a son and a daughter: Diego Holguín de Figueroa Maldonado de Bohorques and María Maldonado de Holguín. Miguel Holguín y Figueroa was mayor of Tunja for four terms; 1558, 1564, 1572 and 1576. He is named in texts until 1576, while his year of death in Tunja is unknown.

See also 

List of conquistadors in Colombia
Spanish conquest of the Muisca
El Dorado
Spanish conquest of the Chibchan Nations, Hernán Pérez de Quesada
Gonzalo Jiménez de Quesada, Nikolaus Federmann

References

Bibliography

Further reading 
 
 
 
 
 
 
 

1516 births
Year of death unknown
16th-century Spanish people
16th-century explorers
Spanish conquistadors
Extremaduran conquistadors
History of the Muisca
History of Colombia
Tunja